Ranjan Gogoi (born 18 November 1954) is an Indian former advocate and former judge who served on the Supreme Court of India for seven years, firstly as a judge from 2012 to 2018, and as the 46th Chief Justice of India for 13 months from 2018 to 2019. He is serving as a Member of the Rajya Sabha, having been nominated by President Ram Nath Kovind on 16 March 2020. Gogoi served as a judge on Gauhati High Court, and then was transferred as a judge to Punjab and Haryana High Court, where he later became chief justice. He is serving as a member of the Committee on External Affairs in the Rajya Sabha.

Born and raised in Dibrugarh, Gogoi was from a political family and he descends from the Ahom dynasty. His maternal grandparents were both state legislators, and his grandmother, Padma Kumari Gohain, was one of the first female MLAs and one of the first female ministers in Assam. His father, Kesab Chandra Gogoi served as Chief Minister of Assam for two months in 1982. Gogoi is the only chief justice, to have been the son of a Chief Minister. His mother, Shanti Priya Gogoi, was a prominent social activist, who founded an NGO named SEWA, in 2000, two years after the death of Kesab Chandra Gogoi in 1998. One of five children, Gogoi's four siblings, also excelled in the respective careers. He is also the first chief justice from Northeast India.

Gogoi studied at Cotton University and later completed his higher studies at the Faculty of Law, University of Delhi. He enrolled at the bar in 1978 and practised at Gauhati High Court under advocate JP Bhattacharjee. He began to practise independently in 1991 and became a senior counsel in 1999 at the court. He served as a judge of the Gauhati High Court from 2001 to 2010 and a judge of Punjab and Haryana High court from 2010 to 2011. He was appointed Chief Justice of Punjab and Haryana High Court in 2011 and served until 2012. His tenure on Punjab and Haryana High Court saw orders which questioned the CBI’s promotion of SPS Rathore, despite the Ruchika Girhotra case, as well as several other judgements. He was nominated to the Supreme Court in 2012 and was sworn in by S. H. Kapadia. Gogoi made several important and landmark judgements during his tenure including the updating of the National Register of Citizens for Assam, and the Soumya Murder case. He also served on the bench that created special courts to try MLAs and MPs, and ruled against the Uttar Pradesh Government law that former Chief Ministers should be allowed to occupy government bungalows. He was appointed Chief Justice of India in 2018 and served until 2019. During his tenure, he oversaw several more important judgements, including the judgement on the Ayodhya dispute and the Rafale deal, before retiring in 2019. In 2020 he was nominated to the Rajya Sabha, and has served on the committee on communications and information technology, and the committee on external affairs.

He is the third Supreme Court judge to serve the Rajya Sabha, and the first to be nominated to his seat, after Ranganath Mishra and Baharul Islam, who were elected as members of the Indian National Congress.  He has also written an autobiography named "Justice for the Judge: An Autobiography". In 2019, he was listed as the third most powerful person in India.

Early life and education 
Ranjan Gogoi was born in a Tai-Ahom family with his family residence being at the K.C. Gogoi Path in Dibrugarh on 18 November 1954. His mother's family can be traced back to Ahom Kingdom's royal family of Swargadeo Gadadhar Singha. Gogoi is a direct descendant and sixth Great-grandson of Ahom King Swargadeo Rajeswar Singha and Great-great-grandnephew of Swargadeo Purandar Singha. His father was Kesab Chandra Gogoi, an Indian National Congress politician who served as Chief Minister of Assam from 13 January 1982 to 19 March 1982. Kesab Chandra Gogoi also served as MLA of Dibrugarh, as well as being a cabinet minister multiple times over his political career. His mother was Shanti Gogoi, who was a social activist and writer. Shanti Gogoi founded the Socio Educational Welfare Association (SEWA), an NGO which aimed to help marginalised communities, and was its president from 2002 to 2016. Shanti Gogoi was an aunt of Shrinjan Rajkumar Gohain. Both his maternal grandparents Jogesh Chandra Borgohain and Padma Kumari Gohain were legislators and ministers in pre-and post-Independence India. His maternal grandfather, Jogesh Chandra Borgohain, served as a Member of Assam Legislative Council in the 1930s. His maternal grandmother, Padma Kumari Gohain, served as MLA of Moran thrice and was social welfare minister in the Bimala Prasad Chaliha cabinet and social welfare and sericulture minister in the Mahendra Mohan Choudhry cabinet.

Gogoi was the second child and second son of 5 children. Each of his 4 siblings became proficient in their respective careers. His elder brother, Anjan, became an Air Marshal in the Indian Air Force until his retirement in 2013 and is currently a member of the North Eastern Council. His younger brother, Nirjan became a consultant urologist in the United Kingdom and his two younger sisters, Indira and Nandita, were members of the Assam civil service until their retirement. His elder brother, Anjan, served as President of SEWA after their mother's retirement in 2016. His younger sister, Nandita, is serving as the President of SEWA.

During Gogoi's childhood in Dibrugarh with his brother Anjan, his father Kesab Chandra Gogoi said that only one of them could go to Sainik School in Goalpara. As both Ranjan and Anjan wanted to go, and with neither relenting, Kesab Chandra Gogoi told them to decide via a coin toss. Anjan won the coin toss, and went to the Sainik School in 1964, then to the National Defence Academy which eventually culminated in his career in the Indian Air Force. Ranjan Gogoi attended Don Bosco school in Dibrugarh, which was only a 20-minute walk away from his home. He then studied at Cotton College (currently known as Cotton University) in Guwahati before moving to Delhi to complete his higher studies. He then studied at St. Stephen's College, Delhi, graduating with honours in history. After completing his bachelor's degree, Gogoi cracked the Civil Services Examination to keep his father's wish. However, he was not chosen for the service he had wanted, which led to his pursuit in law instead. Later on, he told his father that his interest lies in pursuing law instead. He graduated from Faculty of Law, University of Delhi where he received a law degree.

In 1982, the future Law Minister Abdul Muhib Mazumder asked Kesab Chandra Gogoi if his son would also become the Chief Minister of Assam someday. Kesab Chandra Gogoi said his son Ranjan Gogoi would not emulate him, but had the potential to become the Chief Justice of India. His father's assessment proved prophetic.  His elder brother, Anjan Gogoi, admitted this information in an interview with the Times of India.

Early career and high court (1978-2012) 
Gogoi enrolled at the bar in 1978, and practiced at the Gauhati High Court under senior advocate JP Bhattacharjee. His autobiography, Justice for the Judge, said this was due to his father, Kesab Chandra Gogoi, asking for the most esteemed lawyer in Gauhati to take Ranjan Gogoi as a junior. In 1991, he began to practise independently on constitutional, taxation, services and company matters, after Bhattacharjee moved to Kolkata. Gogoi became extremely well known due to his contribution to make Tezpur Mental Hospital an actual research institution. He again rose to prominence after representing then Chief Minister Prafulla Kumar Mahanta in an investigation by the CBI into a letter-of-credit scandal. In 1999, he became a senior counsel at the High Court. He was made a permanent judge of Gauhati High Court on 28 February 2001. During his tenure on Gauhati High Court, he decided to combine similar cases at the court and hear them together. Around 10,000 cases of the education department of Assam were resolved in this way. The Supreme Court collegium undertook a policy where a senior High Court judge, who is due to become the chief justice of another High Court, should be transferred to the High Court before the retirement of the incumbent chief justice. Following this policy, Gogoi was transferred to the Punjab and Haryana High Court on 9 September 2010.

Gogoi became acting Chief Justice of Punjab and Haryana High Court on 3 January 2011, after the retirement of Mukul Mudgal. He was sworn in as Chief Justice on 12 February 2011 by Governor Jagannath Pahadia at Raj Bhavan, Haryana. Several dignitaries were present at the ceremony, including Bhupinder Singh Hooda, Shivraj Patil and Parkash Singh Badal.

During his tenure on the Punjab and Haryana High Court, he made several judgements. In November 2010, a division bench of Gogoi and then Chief Justice Mukul Mudgal questioned the CBI on the promotion of SPS Rathore, despite the pending Ruchika Girhotra case against him. In 2011, Gogoi was on a division bench that was supposed to hear a PIL into the case, but the case was later referred to another bench. On 27 January 2011, while acting chief justice, Gogoi was part of a division bench that ordered all private schools to keep 15% of their places vacant for the economically weaker sections in society, until the 24 February 2011 (when the case was heard again). On 14 March 2011, Gogoi was part of a division bench that directed that the Camelot project was in the catchment area of the Sukhna Lake. On 22 April 2011, Gogoi was part of a bench that ordered that women are allowed to claim maternity leave benefits for the birth of their third child, while allowing a petition from a multipurpose health worker in Haryana. On 22 March 2012, Gogoi was on a division bench that ordered that the schedule of the user fees of the Pinjore-Parwanoo bypass be published in an official gazette and notified in the newspapers. On the 5 April, the bench ordered authorities to open the bypass by the 6 April, which put an end to the delay of the opening.

Supreme court career (2012-2019)

Judge of the Supreme Court 
On 23 April 2012, he was elevated as a judge of the Supreme Court. He was sworn in as a justice of the Supreme Court of India by Chief Justice S. H. Kapadia. Many dignitaries were present, as well as Gogoi's mother, Shanti Priya Gogoi, and elder brother Anjan.

In October 2014, Gogoi praised Prime Minister Narendra Modi on the Swachh Bharat Abhiyan campaign. He spoke on the matter while addressing an event for the fourth foundation day of the National Green Tribunal.

In October 2017, the Supreme court Collegium which consisted of Gogoi, with Chief Justice Dipak Misra, judges Jasti Chelameswar, Madan Lokur and Kurian Joseph, decided to make all of its decisions involving judicial appointments public. The collegium decided that the decisions were to be uploaded on the supreme court website in order to have transparency.

In his 6-year tenure as a judge on the Supreme Court, Gogoi delivered more than 603 judgements. At least 25 judgements were constitution bench judgements which consisted of 5 or more judges.

2018 Supreme Court crisis 
On 12 January 2018, Ranjan Gogoi and three other Supreme Court judges - Jasti Chelameswar, Madan Lokur and Kurian Joseph - became the first to hold a press conference. They alleged problems plaguing the court, in terms of failure in the justice delivery system and allocation of cases and told journalists that the press conference was prompted by the issue of allocating to Justice Arun Mishra, the case of the death of special Central Bureau of Investigation, Judge B.H.Loya. Loya, was a special CBI judge who had died in December 2014. Justice Loya was hearing the Sohrabuddin Sheikh case of 2004, in which police officers and BJP chief Amit Shah were named. Later, Mishra recused himself from the case. Chelameswar retired on 30 June 2018, leaving Gogoi as the second senior-most judge of the Supreme Court, followed by Lokur and Joseph. Notwithstanding his seniority ranking, then-Chief Justice Dipak Misra, recommended Gogoi as his successor.

Chief Justice of the Supreme Court

Appointment and oath 
On 13 September 2018, following the recommendation of Misra on 4 September, President Ram Nath Kovind appointed Gogoi as the next Chief Justice of India.

On 25 September 2018, a bench of Chief Justice Misra, A. M. Khanwilkar, and Dhananjaya Y. Chandrachud asked an advocate to file a mention memo against the appointment of Gogoi as Chief Justice of India, after he commented on the matter to the court. On 26 September, the bench dismissed the plea from the two advocates.On 3 October 2018, he was sworn in as Chief Justice of India, succeeding Dipak Misra. He was administered the oath by President Ram Nath Kovind at the Durbar Hall in Rashtrapati Bhavan. Many dignitaries were present at the event, including Narendra Modi, Rajnath Singh, Arun Jaitley, Mallikarjun Kharge, Sumitra Mahajan, Sudip Bandyopadhyay, Derek O’Brien, Manmohan Singh, H. D. Deve Gowda, L. K. Advani, Sushma Swaraj and many other prominent political figures. Gogoi's mother, Shanti Priya Gogoi, also attended the ceremony.

Tenure 
As Chief Justice, Gogoi attended numerous events including the Second swearing-in ceremony of Narendra Modi, and the swearing in of the first Lokpal Pinaki Chandra Ghose.

In November 2018, Gogoi created the Centre for Research and Planning (CRP) which he described as an "in-house think tank." In a press release, Gogoi stated that the CRP was established to "strengthen the knowledge infrastructure of the Supreme Court."

On 18 June 2019, Gogoi met with the Chief Justice of the Russian Federation Vyacheslav Mikhailovich Lebedev, to discuss judicial cooperation between countries.

On 22 June 2019, Gogoi wrote three letters to Prime Minister Narendra Modi, requesting an increase in the number of judges in the Supreme Court and requesting for the increase in the retirement age of High Court Judges from 62 to 65. The suggestions were prompted by the 58,669 cases pending in the Supreme Court at the time. In  two of the letters Gogoi wrote, he requested for constitutional amendments for the increase in the number of Supreme Court Judges, and the increase in retirement age for High Court judges. He wrote that the increase in retirement age would decrease the pendency of cases. The letters stated that there were many cases that had been pending for many years, including 26 cases that had been pending for 25 years. In a third letter, under articles 128 and 224A, Gogoi requested the revival of tenure appointments for retired High Court and Supreme Court judges, in order to assign them for the cases that have been pending for years. On 31 July, the Union cabinet approved the increase in the number of Supreme Court judges from 31 to 34 (including the Chief Justice.) On 18 September, the four new judges were appointed to the Supreme Court.

During his tenure as chief justice, he recommended 14 judges to the Supreme Court. The 14 judges he recommended were Hemant Gupta, Ramayyagari Subhash Reddy, Mukesh Shah, Ajay Rastogi,  Dinesh Maheshwari, Sanjiv Khanna, Aniruddha Bose, A. S. Bopanna, Bhushan Ramkrishna Gavai, Surya Kant, Krishna Murari, Shripathi Ravindra Bhat, V. Ramasubramanian and Hrishikesh Roy.

2019 sexual harassment allegations 
In April 2019, Gogoi was accused of sexual harassment by a former Supreme Court employee who filed affidavits stating that the Chief Justice had sexually harassed her on 10–11 October 2018 by pressing his body against hers against her will. Gogoi rejected the allegations and described it as a conspiratorial attempt to hamper the independence of the judiciary.

A three-judge internal investigation committee cleared him, a month later. The proceedings were criticized by several  activists, personalities from legal fraternity and two retired justices of the Supreme Court.

A student Surbhi Karwa, who topped Master of Laws in National Law University, Delhi skipped her convocation to avoid receiving her degree from Gogoi in protest. She told Indian Express that "Everything I learnt in the classroom put me in a moral quandary over the last few weeks on whether I should receive the award from CJI Gogoi. The institution he heads failed when sexual harassment allegations were made against him". The National Law University Delhi refuted her skipping of convocation as rubbish and as University "highly perturbed over this instance as it has caused an unnecessary inconvenience to the Chief Justice of India". The in house committee which quickly cleared Gogoi of sexual harassment was chaired by Justice S A Bobde, who himself succeeded Gogoi as Chief Justice. Following this, the woman complainant stated that she was terrified by the systematic victimisation of her family members who were all dismissed from service following her protest against Gogoi's sexual advances. In June 2019, the husband and brother-in-law were reinstated.

In July 2021, Project Pegasus revealed that 11 phone numbers associated with this lady and her immediate family are also allegedly found on a database indicating the possibility of their phones being snooped.

Significant judgements and orders

On arbitration 
A judicial bench consisting of Gogoi and R. Banumathi observed that  the absence of arbitration agreement he introduced new laws, the court can only refer parties to arbitration with written consent of the parties. This could be only be by a joint memorandum or application, not oral consent given by counsel.

On photos of politicians in government ads 
On 13 May 2015, a bench led by Gogoi and with justice Pinaki Chandra Ghose, banned the featuring of politicians in government advertisements. The ruling only made exceptions for the President, Prime Minister, Chief Justice and late political figures such as Mahatma Gandhi. Gogoi said that such photos have the possibility to create a "personality cult" which was a "direct antithesis of democratic functioning."

On 13 July 2015, a bench of Gogoi and N. V. Ramana refused to hear a plea made by Ajay Maken, accusing the Delhi government of disregarding the May ruling.

On 18 May 2016, a bench consisting of Gogoi and Pinaki Chandra Ghose modified the May judgement in 2015, allowing photos of Chief Ministers, Union Ministers, Governors and state ministers in government advertisements.

On income of Amitabh Bachchan 
In May 2016, a bench consisting of Gogoi and Prafulla C. Pant quashed a 2012 Bombay High Court order that had dismissed the Commissioner of Income Tax's power to re-assess the income of Bollywood actor Amitabh Bachchan that he allegedly had obtained from the popular TV show, Kaun Banega Crorepati.

In October 2002, Bachchan filed returns showing income of Rs 14.99 crore for the tax assessment year 2002–03. On 31 March 2003, he filed revised returns, declaring total income for that year in which he claimed expenses at 30% ad hoc amounting to Rs 6.31 crore, showing his income at Rs 8.11 crore. In March 2005, the Income Tax Department determined his income at Rs 56.41 crore for the year.

Special courts for politicians 
On 1 November 2017, a bench consisting of Gogoi and Navin Sinha asked the government to create special courts for MLAs and MPs, giving  the government six weeks for the scheme to be made along with the costs.

On 14 December 2017, the bench of Gogoi and Sinhan ordered for 12 special courts to be created by 1 March 2018.

On 4 December 2018, a bench led by Gogoi, consisting of Sanjay Kishan Kaul and K. M. Joseph ordered the creation of the special courts in each district of Kerala and Bihar by the 14 December.

Dismissal of petition seeking SIT probe 

Led by Gogoi, on 24 January 2018 the Supreme Court dismissed Advocate Kamini Jaiswal's petition seeking a Special Investigation Team (SIT) investigation of attacks on Kanhaiya Kumar, the Jawaharlal Nehru University student union leader, on 15 and 17 February 2016 at Patiala House Court while he was escorted to courtroom in a sedition case.

On Rafale deal 

On 14 December 2018, a bench of Gogoi and with justices Sanjay Kishan Kaul and K. M. Joseph, reserved the verdict on the Rafale deal and dismissed all petitions seeking a probe into it.

On 14 November 2019, a bench consisting of Gogoi, Sanjay Kishan Kaul and K. M. Joseph, dismissed petitions seeking a review of the verdict in December 2018.

On Govindaswamy vs State of Kerala 

23-year-old Soumya, an employee of a Kochi shopping mall, was assaulted by one Govindaswamy in an empty ladies' coach of Ernakulam-Shoranur passenger train on 1 February 2011. She was allegedly pushed off from the slow-moving train, carried to a wooded area and subsequently raped. She succumbed to injuries at the Government Medical College Hospital, Thrissur, on 6 February 2011. Govindaswamy was sentenced to death for murder by a trial court and the order was upheld by Kerala High Court on 17 December 2013.

On 15 September 2016, the Apex Court Bench consisting of Gogoi, Pant and Uday Umesh Lalit set aside the death penalty  and sentenced Govindaswamy to a maximum of life imprisonment for rape and other offences of causing bodily injuries.However, to hold that the accused is liable under Section 302 IPC what is required is an intention to cause death or knowledge that the act of the accused is likely to cause death. The intention of the accused in keeping the deceased in a supine position, according to P.W. 64, was for the purposes of the sexual assault. The requisite knowledge that in the circumstances such an act may cause death, also, cannot be attributed to the accused, inasmuch as, the evidence of P.W. 64 itself is to the effect that such knowledge and information is, in fact, parted with in the course of training of medical and para-medical staff. The fact that the deceased survived for a couple of days after the incident and eventually died in Hospital would also clearly militate against any intention of the accused to cause death by the act of keeping the deceased in a supine position. Therefore, in the totality of the facts discussed above, the accused cannot be held liable for injury no.2. Similarly, in keeping the deceased in a supine position, intention to cause death or knowledge that such actions may cause death, cannot be attributed to the accused. We are, accordingly, of the view that the offence under Section 302 IPC cannot be held to be made out against the accused so as to make him liable therefor. Rather, we are of the view that the acts of assault, etc. attributable to the accused would more appropriately attract the offence under Section 325 IPC. We accordingly find the accused-appellant guilty of the said offence and sentence him to undergo rigorous imprisonment for seven years for commission of the same...

...While the conviction under Section 376 IPC, Section 394 read with Section 397 IPC and Section 447 IPC and the sentences imposed for commission of the said offences are maintained, the conviction under Section 302 IPC is set aside...
Following the judgement of setting aside the death sentence of the accused in the said Govindaswamy vs State Of Kerala case, Gogoi and his bench were severely criticized by members of the public, members of the media, political leaders including Chief Minister of Kerala, Pinarayi Vijayan, Law Minister of Kerala, A.K. Balan, Senior CPI(M) leader V. S. Achuthanandan, and jurists including Supreme Court lawyer Kaleeswaram Raj and Supreme Court Justice (retd) Markandey Katju.

In a blog entry on 17 September, retired judge Markandey Katju described the Supreme Court's verdict as a "grave error" not expected of "judges who had been in the legal world for decades". He criticised the Bench for believing "hearsay evidence" that Soumya jumped off the train instead of being pushed out by Govindaswamy: Even a student of law in a law college knows this elementary principle that hearsay evidence is inadmissible.In response, the SC bench led by Gogoi decided to convert that blog by Justice Markandey Katju into a review petition and asked him to personally appear in court to debate. On 11 November 2016, he appeared in the court and submitted his arguments. The Court then dictated the order rejecting the review petition and issued contempt of court notice to him stating that "Prima facie, the statements made seem to be an attack on the Judges and not on the judgment". On 6 January 2017, the Supreme Court accepted Katju's apology and closed the contempt proceedings against him.

On NRC of Assam 
On 5 December 2017, while disposing of a Writ Petition (Civil) No. 1020 of 2017, Kamalakhya Dey Purkayastha & Others Versus Union of India & Others clubbed with similar other petitions seeking clarification as to the meaning  of people who are originally inhabitants of the state of Assam, a term which appears in a schedule to the Citizenship (Registration Of Citizens And Issue Of National Identity Cards) Rules, 2003 pertaining to special provision as to manner of preparation of National Register of Indian Citizen in state of Assam, the bench consisting of Justices Ranjan Gogoi and  Rohinton Fali Nariman observed that The exercise of upgradation of NRC is not intended to be one of identification and determination of who are original inhabitants of the State of Assam.....   Citizens who are originally inhabitants/residents of the State of Assam and those who are not are at par for inclusion in the NRC.The National Register of Indian Citizens or in short the NRC, at its root, comprises all the Local Registers of Indian Citizens containing details of Indian citizens usually residing in a village or rural area or town or ward or demarcated area (demarcated by the Registrar General of Citizen Registration) within a ward in a town or urban area.

The Citizenship (Registration of Citizens and Issue of National Identity Card) Rules, 2003 were amended in November 2009 and March 2010 for preparation of National Register of Citizens by inviting applications from all the residents in Assam for updation of the old National Register of Citizens (NRC) 1951 in Assam based on relevant records. In order to undertake updating of NRC in all districts of Assam, pilot projects for updating of NRC in two blocks (one each in Kamrup and Barpeta districts) were started in June 2010. Subsequently, pilot projects were stopped due to law and order problems. A second attempt to update the register for Assam was made by the Government of India through issuing a Gazette Notification in  December 2013.

On 17 December 2014, the bench consisting of Justices Ranjan Gogoi and Rohinton Fali Nariman mandated the Government of India to complete the finalization of final updated NRC for the entire state of Assam by 1 January 2016.

Ayodhya dispute 

On 9 November 2019, Ranjan Gogoi and four other Supreme Court judges (Justices Sharad Arvind Bobde, Dhananjaya Y. Chandrachud, Ashok Bhushan and S. Abdul Nazeer) pronounced the verdict regarding the Ayodhya Ram Janambhoomi-Babri Masjid title dispute case. After 40 days of daily hearings from 6 August, the five-judge bench unanimously decided in favour of awarding the land to the Hindu side to build a Lord Rama temple in the place.

This was his last case before retirement on 17 November 2019.

Other notable incidents 

During the 2019–2021 Jammu and Kashmir lockdown, Mehbooba Mufti's daughter Iltija Mufti asked the Supreme Court for permission to meet her mother and travel freely. Ranjan Gogoi, who was the Chief Justice of India at that time, asked, “Why do you want to move around? It is very cold in Srinagar.”

Member of Rajya Sabha (2020-present)

Nomination and oath 
Gogoi was nominated to the Rajya Sabha by President Ram Nath Kovind. On 19 March 2020, he took oath of office as a Member of Parliament in Rajya Sabha in presence of Chairman of Rajya Sabha.

Tenure 
Gogoi was appointed to the Parliamentary Standing Committee on External Affairs on 23 July 2020. He resigned in September 2021, and instead became a member on the committee of communications and information technology. He resigned from the committee in May 2022, and on 5 May 2022 he again became a member on the Parliamentary Standing Committee on External Affairs.

On 2 September 2020, following an RTI being filed by India Today, the Rajya Sabha Secretariat revealed that Gogoi was the only member of the Rajya Sabha who does not take allowances or a salary.

Gogoi has stated he does not intend to become a minister or join a political party.

Personal life

Family and health 
Gogoi is married to Rupanjali Gogoi, and they have two children together, a son Raktim Gogoi and a daughter Rashmi Gogoi, both of whom are advocates. His daughter, Rashmi, is married to the son of former Delhi High Court justice Valmiki Mehta.

Gogoi suffered from pancreatitis in the 1980s. He again suffered from the same disease in April 2011, when he was Chief Justice of Punjab and Haryana High Court, and was admitted to the Post Graduate Institute of Medical Education and Research, and later was flown to the Ganga Ram Hospital in Delhi for treatment.

Interests and security 
Gogoi has visited numerous countries, including Russia, to attend the Conference of Chief Justices, Turkey, to attend the Conference of Islamic Countries, Indonesia, U.K, France, Germany and the Netherlands.

Gogoi is not on the social media platform Twitter, and several tweets were falsely accused of being made by Gogoi.

He is one of the 63 individuals in India under the Z plus security cover provided by the Central Reserve Police Force.

Finances 
When Gogoi became Chief Justice of India on 3 October 2018, he was one out of the 11 Supreme court justices who made their assets and finances public. He disclosed he had no car, and the only property he had was gifted to him by his mother in June 2015.

See also 

 List of current members of the Rajya Sabha
 List of nominated members of the Rajya Sabha
 List of former judges of the Supreme Court of India

References

External links 

1954 births
Living people
20th-century Indian judges
21st-century Indian judges
Chief justices of India
Chief Justices of the Punjab and Haryana High Court
Cotton College, Guwahati alumni
Delhi University alumni
Judges of the Gauhati High Court
Justices of the Supreme Court of India
People from Dibrugarh district
St. Stephen's College, Delhi alumni